Løvika is a village in Ålesund Municipality in Møre og Romsdal county, Norway. Løvika has approximately 200 inhabitants and is mostly known for its farming industry.

References

Ålesund
Villages in Møre og Romsdal